Territorial Assembly elections were held in Ubangi-Shari on 30 March 1952. The result was a victory for the Movement for the Social Evolution of Black Africa (MESAN), which won 17 seats (all in the second college).

Results

Aftermath
Following the elections, Henri Mabille was elected chair of the legislature.

References

Ubangi
Elections in the Central African Republic
1952 in Ubangi-Shari
Election and referendum articles with incomplete results
March 1952 events in Africa